I-Shou University FC is an association football club from Taiwan. They play at the highest level and their home venue is the 5,000 capacityTaichung Football Field. It is a university football team.

External links
 I-Shou University logo

Football clubs in Taiwan
University and college football clubs in Taiwan